The 1852 Atlantic hurricane season was one of only three Atlantic hurricane seasons in which every known tropical cyclone attained hurricane status.  Five tropical cyclones were reported during the season, which lasted from late August through the middle of October; these dates fall within the range of most Atlantic tropical cyclone activity, and none of the cyclones coexisted with another. Though there were officially five tropical cyclones in the season, hurricane scholar Michael Chenoweth assessed two of the cyclones as being the same storm.  There may have been other unconfirmed tropical cyclones during the season, as meteorologist Christopher Landsea estimated that up to six storms were missed each year from the official database; this estimate was due to small tropical cyclone size, sparse ship reports, and relatively unpopulated coastlines.


Season summary
Every tropical cyclone in the season was of hurricane status, or with winds at or exceeding . In only two other seasons did every cyclone attain hurricane status; those years were 1858 and 1884.  All five cyclones affected land; the strongest was the first storm, which caused severe damage and loss of life when it made landfall near the border between Mississippi and Alabama. The second storm of the season struck Puerto Rico, where it caused over 100 deaths, primarily from flooding. In the middle of September, the third storm moved across Florida with strong wind gusts and light rainfall, and a week later the fourth storm passed over or north of the Lesser and Greater Antilles. The last storm hit the Florida Panhandle, though damage was less than expected.

Timeline

Systems

Hurricane One

The Great Mobile Hurricane of 1852 was the first tropical cyclone of the year. It moved on a west-northwest motion before passing through the Bahamas as it attained hurricane status on August 20. The storm slowed on August 25 before turning northward, and early on August 26 it made landfall near Pascagoula, Mississippi at peak strength, and the hurricane rapidly weakened to tropical storm status as it accelerated east-northeastward.

In the Florida Keys, rough waves forced several ships ashore, leaving some damaged. Strong waves created four new channels in the Chandeleur Islands, and the storm's passage also destroyed the island lighthouse; the three keepers were found three days later. Two schooners were also washed ashore along Cat Island. Damage along the coastline was estimated at $1 million (1852 USD, $26 million 2008 USD), and several people died. While crossing the southeastern United States, the storm brought light rainfall but moderately strong winds; in Charleston, South Carolina, the storm destroyed several bridges and crop fields.

Hurricane Two

Hurricane San Lorenzo of 1852

One meteorologist assessed the hurricane as being located near Antigua on September 3. After crossing southwestern Puerto Rico, the hurricane emerged into the Mona Passage as a tropical storm. Late on September 5 it made landfall on eastern Dominican Republic; it quickly weakened over Hispaniola, dissipating on September 6 over the northwestern portion of the island. An assessment by scholar Michael Chenoweth in 2006 indicated this storm was the same as the next hurricane, with it continuing northwestward and ultimately reaching the Gulf of Mexico. Due to not being considered the same cyclone in the official hurricane database, this hurricane and the following hurricane are listed separately. There, the passage of the storm caused severe flooding, which destroyed large quantities of crops and damaged several roads. Storm damage was heaviest between Guayanilla and Mayagüez. More than 100 people were killed in Puerto Rico, many of whom died due to flooding.

Hurricane Three

A hurricane was located in the central Gulf of Mexico on September 9, potentially the same hurricane as the previous storm. It tracked generally eastward toward the coast of Florida, with its hurricane intensity estimation based on two ship reports. At about 0000 UTC on September 12, it moved ashore near Clearwater, Florida as a minimal hurricane, with an estimated minimum barometric central pressure of 985 mbar. Accelerating east-northeastward while crossing the state, the cyclone emerged into the Atlantic Ocean as a weakened tropical storm before regaining hurricane status on September 13.

A post in Fort Meade, Florida reported at least  of rainfall during the storm's passage. The hurricane was considered "violent", and gusts were estimated to have reached hurricane force. Rough seas and strong easterly winds beached a vessel near St. Augustine.

Hurricane Four

With a steady west-northwest path, the storm moved across the northern Lesser Antilles on September 23, during which it intensified into a hurricane. It passed a short distance north of Puerto Rico and the Dominican Republic as it reached its peak intensity of 90 mph (150 km). Late on September 26 the hurricane turned northwestward, bringing it through the Turks and Caicos Islands and eastern Bahamas. However, one hurricane researcher assessed the hurricane as lasting until October 3, with the cyclone turning eastward and dissipating near the Azores.

Hurricane Five

Passing a short distance south of the island, the hurricane tracked northwestward and brushed the Yucatán Peninsula before turning north-northeastward into the Gulf of Mexico. Late on October 9, it made landfall a short distance east of Apalachicola, Florida at peak winds with an estimated pressure of 969 mbar. Rapidly weakening to tropical storm status, the cyclone continued northeastward and emerged into the Atlantic Ocean from North Carolina on October 11.

Heavy damage was reported in Jamaica. Upon making landfall in Florida, the hurricane produced a  storm tide, and in Georgia, hurricane-force winds extended into the southwestern portion of the state, while tropical storm force winds occurred along the coastline. In the state, moderate winds damaged trees and roofs, though the destruction was less than anticipated.

See also

Atlantic hurricane season
List of Atlantic hurricanes

References

Atlantic hurricane seasons
 
1852 in Mexico
1852 in Puerto Rico
1852 in the United States
Articles which contain graphical timelines
Hurricanes
1852 meteorology